Mueang Nakhon Phanom) is the capital district (amphoe mueang) of Nakhon Phanom province, northeastern Thailand.

Geography
Neighboring districts are (from the south clockwise): That Phanom, Renu Nakhon of Nakhon Phanom Province; Kusuman of Sakon Nakhon province; Pla Pak and Tha Uthen of Nakhon Phanom Province. To the east across the Mekong River is the Laotian province Khammouan.

History
In 1917 the district name was changed from Mueang to Nong Buek (หนองบึก). In 1938 it was renamed Mueang Nakhon Phanom.

Economy
Khok Phu Kratae and Phai Lom villages in At Samat Subdistrict will be the site of a special economic zone (SEZ). As many as 400 families are to be evicted in the course of the project. Gen Prayut Chan-o-cha, head of the junta's National Council for Peace and Order (NCPO) and prime minister, in May 2015 invoked his authority under Section 44 of the Interim Charter to announce NCPO Order No. 17/2015. The order mandates turning large areas in Tak, Mukdahan, Nong Khai, Sa Kaeo, and Trat provinces into special economic zones (SEZs), where deregulation of industry and tax cuts are offered to lure investors. In addition to the pilot SEZ projects in these five provinces, more land in five other provinces, Chiang Rai, Nakhon Phanom, Kanchanaburi, Songkhla, and Narathiwat, are to be expropriated and cleared for SEZs.

Administration
The district is divided into 15 sub-districts (tambons), which are further subdivided into 169 villages (mubans). The town (thesaban mueang) Nakhon Phanom covers tambon Nai Mueang and Nong Saeng and parts of tambons At Samat and Nong Yat. There are a further 13 tambon administrative organizations (TAO).

References

External links
amphoe.com (Thai)

Mueang Nakhon Phanom